Conostephium preissii is a species of flowering plant in the family Ericaceae and is endemic to the southwest of Western Australia. It is an erect shrub with many stems, egg-shaped to oblong leaves and white and purplish to reddish-pink flowers.

Description
The upper half of the ovary is glabrous, the stamens attached near the base of the petal tube. Flowering occurs from September to December.

Taxonomy and naming
Conostephium preissii was first formally described in 1845 by Otto Wilhelm Sonder in Lehmann's Plantae Preissianae. The specific epithet, preissii, honours Ludwig Preiss.

Distribution and habitat
This conostephium grows in heath on sandplains and winter-wet flats mainly on the coastal plain from near Eneabba to near Harvey, but also east of the Darling Scarp and further inland, in the Avon Wheatbelt, Coolgardie, Geraldton Sandplains, Jarrah Forest, Mallee and Swan Coastal Plain bioregions of south-western Western Australia.

Conservation status
Conostephium preissii is listed as "not threatened" by the Government of Western Australia Department of Biodiversity, Conservation and Attractions.

References

Eudicots of Western Australia
Ericales of Australia
Endemic flora of Western Australia
Plants described in 1845
Taxa named by Otto Wilhelm Sonder
preissii